Clibadium subsessilifolium is a species of flowering plant in the family Asteraceae. It is found only in Ecuador.

References

subsessilifolium
Endemic flora of Ecuador
Data deficient plants
Taxonomy articles created by Polbot